Epectaptera umbrescens is a moth of the subfamily Arctiinae. It was described by Schaus in 1905. It is found in Peru.

References

External links
 Natural History Museum Lepidoptera generic names catalog

Arctiinae
Moths described in 1905